14 Vulpeculae is a single, yellow-white hued star in the northern constellation of Vulpecula and proximate to the Dumbbell Nebula (M 27) on the celestial sphere, although actually much closer to the Earth. It is a dim star that is faintly visible to the naked eye with an apparent visual magnitude of 5.68.

This is an F-type main-sequence star with a stellar classification of F1 Vn, where the 'n' notation indicates nebulous lines due to rapid rotation. At the estimated age of 1.7 billion years old, it is spinning with a projected rotational velocity of 150 km/s and has sub-solar metallicity. The star has 1.5 times the mass of the Sun and is radiating 11 times the Sun's luminosity from its photosphere at an effective temperature of about 6,938 K.

References

External links
 

F-type main-sequence stars
Vulpecula
Vulpeculae, 14
Durchmusterung objects
189410
098375
7641